The year 1933 in architecture involved some significant architectural events and new buildings.

Events
 The Bauhaus school in Berlin is permanently closed by the Nazi government.
 Modern Architectural Research Group (MARS Group) established as a think tank by younger architects and critics involved in the modernist movement in Great Britain.
 Completion of restoration of Herstmonceux Castle in England by Walter Godfrey.

Buildings and structures

Buildings opened
 February 21 – Nebotičnik skyscraper, Ljubljana, Yugoslavia, designed by Vladimir Šubic.
 July – New Midland Hotel, Morecambe, Lancashire, England, designed by Oliver Hill.
 August 23 – Leeds Civic Hall, Yorkshire, England, designed by Vincent Harris in 1926.
 November 29 – Schwandbach Bridge, Switzerland, designed by Robert Maillart.
 Royal Masonic Hospital (later Ravenscourt Park Hospital) at Ravenscourt Park in London, designed by Thomas S. Tait of Sir John Burnet, Tait and Lorne.
 Labworth Café on Canvey Island, England, designed by engineer Ove Arup.

Buildings completed

 St Gabriel's Anglican Church in Blackburn, England, designed by F. X. Velarde.
 Városmajori Roman Catholic church in Budapest, completed by Bertalan Árkay following the death in 1932 of his father Aladár Árkay.
 Myer Emporium renovation, Bourke Street, Melbourne, Australia.
 The Round House, designed by Berthold Lubetkin's Tecton Architectural Group to house gorillas at London Zoo, one of the first modernist buildings in Britain.
 Battersea Power Station, London, with Giles Gilbert Scott as consultant architect, begins operation.
 College Hall, Royal Air Force College Cranwell, England, designed by James Grey West.
 Mardon Hall, first of the University of Exeter Halls of Residence in England, designed by Vincent Harris.
 Darbishire Quad at Somerville College, Oxford, England, designed by Morley Horder.
 Mercado de Abastos de Algeciras (market hall), Spain, designed by Eduardo Torroja.
 Villa Markelius in Stockholm, designed by Sven Markelius for himself.
 Schminke house in Löbau, Germany, designed by Hans Scharoun.
 Engel House, White City (Tel Aviv), Mandatory Palestine, designed by Zeev Rechter.
 Töss Footbridge, Winterthur, Switzerland, designed by Robert Maillart.

Awards
 AIA Gold Medal – Ragnar Östberg.
 RIBA Royal Gold Medal – Charles Reed Peers.
 Grand Prix de Rome, architecture – Alexandre Courtois.

Publications
 John Betjeman – Ghastly Good Taste, or the depressing story of the rise and fall of British architecture.
 The Information Book of Sir John Burnet, Tait & Lorne.

Births
 February 2 – Rodney Gordon, British architect (died 2008)
 June 25 – Álvaro Siza Vieira, Portuguese architect and architectural educator
 July 23
 Raimund Abraham, Austrian architect (died 2010)
 Richard Rogers, Italian-born British modernist and functionalist architect (died 2021)
 October 29 – John Andrews, Australian architect
 November 4 – Terje Moe, Norwegian architect (died 2009)
 November 24 - Isaac Fola-Alade, Nigerian architect (1004 Estate) (died  2021)

Deaths

 January – Edward Lippincott Tilton, American architect based in New York (born 1861)
 March 10 – Émile André, French architect, artist and furniture designer (born 1871)
 April 16 – Harold Peto, English architect and garden designer (born 1854)
 August 8
 Luca Beltrami, Italian architect and architectural historian (born 1854)
 Adolf Loos, Austrian/Czechoslovak architect and writer (born 1870)
 December 4 – W. G. R. Sprague, British theatre architect (born 1863)
 December 24 – Sir Frank Baines, English architect (born 1877)

References